The 2018–19 Women's Super50 Cup was a 50-over women's cricket competition that took place in the West Indies. It took place in March 2019, with 6 teams taking part and all matches taking place in Guyana. Barbados won the tournament, winning all five of their matches to claim their third 50-over title in five seasons.

The tournament was followed by the 2018–19 Twenty20 Blaze.

Competition format 
Teams played in a round-robin in a group of six, therefore playing 5 matches overall. Matches were played using a one day format with 50 overs per side. The top team in the group were crowned the Champions.

The group worked on a points system with positions being based on the total points. Points were awarded as follows:

Win: 4 points 
Tie: 2 points 
Loss: 0 points.
Abandoned/No Result: 2 points.
Bonus Point: 1 bonus point available per match.

Points table

Source: Windies Cricket

Fixtures

Statistics

Most runs

Source: CricketArchive

Most wickets

Source: CricketArchive

References

External links
 Series home at Windies Cricket

Women's Super50 Cup
2019 in West Indian cricket
Domestic cricket competitions in 2018–19